Kodman Nagappa Alva was an Indian politician who served as Member of Parliament in the Rajya Sabha and as Minister of Health in the State Government of Karnataka, then known as Mysore State.

Positions held

Early life and education

Born in Tulu Speaking Bunt family of landlords, Alva was a medical practitioner who earned the degree M. B. B. S. prior to entering politics.

Political career
His political career began when he was elected to the Karnataka Legislative Assembly in 1957 representing the Suratkal constituency. In 1962 he was reelected to Karnataka Legislative Assembly and, during this tenure, he served as Minister of Health in the State Government of Mysore (now known as Karnataka).  In 1970 he was elected to Rajya Sabha, the upper house of India's Parliament (The Sansad) and served a full term of six years until 1976.

Personal life
His son, Jeevaraj Alva too served as member of  Karnataka Legislative Assembly and Minister in Ramakrishna Hegde administration. He was married to Kalyani Alva and had four children (three sons and a daughter).

Awards and recognition
The life of Dr. K. Nagappa Alva was released as biography.

References

Daiji World Media, "Mangalore: Book to Commemorate Parliamentarian Dr Alva’s Birth Centenary Released", August 18, 2010.
Mangalorean.com, "M'Lore Book On Legislators Released", August 18, 2010.
The Hindu, "Rich Tribute Paid to Former Minister Nagappa Alva ", August 18, 2010.

Indian National Congress politicians from Karnataka
1908 births
Rajya Sabha members from Karnataka
Year of death missing